Chenar Shureh (also Romanized as Chenār Shūreh) is a village in Gerit Rural District, Papi District, Khorramabad County, Lorestan Province, Iran. At the 2006 census, its population was 154, in 32 families.

References 

Towns and villages in Khorramabad County